New Beat is a rock album released in 2002 by New York City-based trio The Exit.

Track listing
"Worthless"
"Lonely Man's Wallet"
"Sit and Wait"
"Scream and Shout"
"Trapped"
"Find Me"
"Still Waiting"
"When I'm Free"
"Defacto"
"Question the Chorus"
"Watertown"

References

The Exit albums
2002 albums
Albums produced by Daniel Rey